Lee Kun-hee (9 January 194225 October 2020) was a South Korean business magnate who served as the chairman of Samsung Group from 1987 to 2008, and again from 2010 until his death in 2020. He is also credited with the transformation of Samsung to one of the world's largest business entities that engages in semiconductors, smartphones, electronics, shipbuilding, construction, and other businesses. Since Lee Kun-hee became the chairman of Samsung, the company became the world's largest manufacturer of smartphones, memory chips, and appliances. He was the third son of Samsung founder Lee Byung-chul. With an estimated net worth of US$21 billion at the time of his death, he was the richest person in South Korea, a position that he had held since 2007.

He was convicted twice, once in 1996 and subsequently in 2008, for corruption and tax evasion charges, but was pardoned on both instances. In 2014, Lee was named the world's 35th most powerful person and the most powerful Korean by Forbes's list of the world's most powerful people along with his son, Lee Jae-yong.

Early life

Lee Kun-hee was born on 9 January 1942 in Daegu, during the Japanese occupation of Korea. He was the third son of Lee Byung-chul, the founder of the Samsung group, which was set up as an exporter of fruit and dried fish. He went on to get a degree in economics from Waseda University, a private university in Japan. He studied for a masters program in business from the George Washington University in Washington, D.C., but did not get a degree.

Career

First period at Samsung
Lee joined the Samsung Group in 1966 with the Tongyang Broadcasting Company, and later went on to work for Samsung's construction and trading company.

He took over the chairmanship of the conglomerate on 24 December 1987, two weeks after the death of his father, Lee Byung-chul. In 1993, believing that Samsung Group was overly focused on producing large quantities of low-quality goods and was not prepared to compete in quality, Lee famously said, "Change everything except your wife and kids". This call was an attempt to drive innovation at the company and to face up to the competition at that time from rivals like Sony Corporation. In a declaration now known as the 'Frankfurt Declaration', he had his executives gather in the German city in 1993 and called for a change in the company's approach to quality, even if it meant lower sales. The company went on to become the largest manufacturer of televisions, outpacing Sony corporation in 2006.

Scandals and controversies
Lee was convicted for having paid bribes to president Roh Tae-woo in 1996. He was subsequently pardoned by president Kim Young-sam.

On 14 January 2008, Korean police raided Lee's home and office in an ongoing probe into accusations that Samsung was responsible for a slush fund used to bribe influential prosecutors, judges, and political figures in South Korea. On 4 April 2008, Lee denied allegations against him in the scandal. After a second round of questioning by the South Korean prosecutors, on 11 April 2008, Lee was quoted by reporters as saying, "I am responsible for everything. I will assume full moral and legal responsibility.” On 21 April 2008, he resigned and stated: "We, including myself, have caused troubles to the nation with the special probe; I deeply apologize for that, and I'll take full responsibility for everything, both legally and morally."

On 16 July 2008, The New York Times reported the Seoul Central District Court had found Lee guilty on charges of financial wrongdoing and tax evasion. Prosecutors requested that Lee be sentenced to seven years in prison and fined 350 billion won (approximately US$312 million). The court fined him 110 billion won (approximately US$98 million) and gave him a three-years suspended sentence. However, on 29 December 2009, South Korean president Lee Myung-bak pardoned Lee, stating that the intent of the pardon was to allow Lee to remain on the International Olympic Committee. In Lee Myung-bak's corruption trial, this pardon was revealed to have been in exchange for bribes; further bribery and other political corruption between former President Lee and Lee Kun-hee was also exposed.

Think Samsung, a 2010 book by Kim Yong-chul, former Samsung legal counsel, alleged that Lee was guilty of corruption. In particular, it claimed that he stole up to 10 trillion won (approximately US$8.9 billion) from Samsung subsidiaries, tampered with evidence, and bribed government officials to guarantee his son would succeed him.

Return to Samsung
On 24 March 2010, Lee announced his return to Samsung Electronics as its chairman. He continued in this position until 2014, when he suffered an incapacitating heart attack and his son, Lee Jae-yong, became the Samsung group's de facto leader. He is credited with having transformed Samsung into the world's largest manufacturer of smartphones, televisions, and memory chips. At the time of his death, the company was worth US$300 billion, and with an estimated net worth US$20.7 billion per Bloomberg's billionaire index, he was the richest person in South Korea; a position that he had held since 2007.

Following his death, Lee's heirs are expected to face an estate tax of around US$10 billion, which might potentially result in dilution of the family's stake in the conglomerate. This stems from South Korea's high estate tax of 50% for estates larger than US$3 billion, which is second only to Japan, amongst the OECD countries.

Personal life
Lee Kun-hee was married to Hong Ra-hee until his death. Hong is the daughter of Hong Jin-ki, the former chairman of the JoongAng Ilbo and Tongyang Broadcasting Company.

His siblings and some of their children are also executives of major Korean business groups. Lee Boo-jin, his eldest daughter, is president and CEO of Hotel Shilla, a luxury hotel chain, as well as president of Everland Resort, a theme park and resort operator that is "widely seen as the de facto holding company for the conglomerate" according to the Associated Press.

Lee had four children: the eldest child and the only son, Lee Jae-yong (born 1968), and three daughters, Lee Boo-jin (born 1970), Lee Seo-hyun (born 1973), and Lee Yoon-hyung (1979–2005) who died by suicide.

Lee's older brother Lee Maeng-hee and older sister Lee Sook-hee initiated legal action against him in February 2012, asking a South Korean court to award them shares of Samsung companies totaling US$850 million (913.563 billion won), which they claim their father willed to them. Court hearings began in May 2012. On 6 February 2014, courts in South Korea dismissed the case.

Illness and death

Lee was treated for lung cancer in the late 1990s and was tested again for cancer in 2005, at the MD Anderson Medical Center in Houston, Texas, with no subsequent concerns being announced. He was hospitalized in Seoul in May 2014 after suffering a heart attack, and lapsed into a coma, which he remained in until his death on 25 October 2020, at the age of 78.

Lee's death triggered the largest inheritance tax bill in history, of 12 trillion won ($10.78 billion).

Posthumous

The heirs to the late Lee announced in the Spring of 2021 that the businessman's multibillion-dollar collection of more than 23,000 works of art would be dispersed throughout public institutions in South Korea. Contrary to this announcement, the country's minister of culture, sports, and tourism, Hwang Hee, announced plans to build a new museum dedicated to the Lee collection.

References

1942 births
2020 deaths
20th-century South Korean businesspeople
21st-century South Korean businesspeople
Businesspeople in electronics
George Washington University School of Business alumni
George Washington University alumni
International Olympic Committee members
South Korean people convicted of tax crimes
People with disorders of consciousness
Recipients of the Legion of Honour
Recipients of the Olympic Order
Samsung people
South Korean billionaires
South Korean founders of automobile manufacturers
Waseda University alumni
People with severe brain damage
People convicted of bribery
Lee family (South Korea)
Recipients of South Korean presidential pardons